Deshawntee "Ironhead" Gallon (born January 18, 1994) is an American football strong safety for the Ottawa Redblacks of the Canadian Football League (CFL). He played college football at Georgia Southern.

Professional career

Arizona Cardinals
Gallon signed with the Arizona Cardinals as an undrafted free agent on May 2, 2017. He was waived on September 2, 2017.

Philadelphia Eagles
Gallon was signed by the Philadelphia Eagles on August 27, 2018. He was waived on September 1, 2018.

Ottawa Redblacks
After the CFL canceled the 2020 season due to the COVID-19 pandemic, Gallon chose to opt-out of his contract with the Ottawa Redblacks on September 3, 2020. He re-signed with the team on November 2, 2020. He was released by the Redblacks on June 24, 2021, and re-signed again on July 5.

Personal
As a big fan of former New Orleans Saints' running back Craig "Ironhead" Heyward, Gallon's mother’s ex-husband began calling him "Ironhead" as a child. During his time at Georgia Southern friends and teammates also began calling him "Ironhead".

References

External links
Georgia Southern Eagles bio

Living people
1994 births
Players of American football from Florida
People from Madison, Florida
American football safeties
Georgia Southern Eagles football players
Arizona Cardinals players
Philadelphia Eagles players
Ottawa Redblacks players